Scott Andrew Snodgress (born September 20, 1989) is an American former professional baseball pitcher. He played in Major League Baseball for the Chicago White Sox in 2014.

Amateur career
A native of Yucaipa, California, Snodgress attended Yucaipa High School and played college baseball at Stanford University. In 2010, he played collegiate summer baseball in the Cape Cod Baseball League for the Yarmouth-Dennis Red Sox.

Professional career

Chicago White Sox (2011-2014)
He was drafted by the Chicago White Sox in the 5th round of the 2011 MLB Draft. He started his career in 2011 with the Rookie Level Great Falls Voyagers. He finished the 2011 season a record of 3-3 in 16 games (12 starts),  innings, 3.34 ERA, 61 hits, 17 walks and 68 strikeouts. Snodgress started the 2012 season with Class A Kannapolis Intimidators but was later promoted to Class A-Advanced Winston-Salem Dash. He finished the 2012 season with a combined record of 7-3 in 27 games (27 starts), 141 innings, 3.00 ERA, 112 hits, 64 walks and 128 strikeouts.

Before the start of the 2013 season, Snodgress was ranked the White Sox #6 prospect. Through the 2013 season at Double-A Birmingham Barons, Snodgress pitched in 26 games (26 starts) with a record of 11-11. In  innings of work at Birmingham, Snodgress had a 4.70 ERA, 146 hits, 59 walks and 90 strikeouts.

On August 31, 2014, the White Sox purchased his contract and promoted Snodgress to the major leagues. He made his major league debut on September 3 against the Minnesota Twins.

On December 2, 2014, the White Sox declined to tender him a contract and he became a free agent.

Los Angeles Angels
On December 10, 2014, the Los Angeles Angels signed Snodgress to a minor league contract with an invite to 2015 spring training. He was released on July 27, 2015.

San Diego Padres
Snodgress  signed a minor league contract with the San Diego Padres on February 15, 2016. He was released in March 2016.

Southern Maryland Blue Crabs
On April 8, 2016, Snodgress signed with the Southern Maryland Blue Crabs of the Atlantic League of Professional Baseball.

Chicago White Sox (2017)
On February 18, 2017, Snodgress signed a minor league deal with the Chicago White Sox. He elected free agency on November 6, 2017.

References

External links

1989 births
Living people
People from Fontana, California
Baseball players from California
Major League Baseball pitchers
Chicago White Sox players
Stanford Cardinal baseball players
Great Falls Voyagers players
Kannapolis Intimidators players
Winston-Salem Dash players
Birmingham Barons players
Charlotte Knights players
Glendale Desert Dogs players
Salt Lake Bees players
Southern Maryland Blue Crabs players
Yarmouth–Dennis Red Sox players